Speirops are a group of birds in the white-eye family Zosteropidae. They are restricted to the islands of the Gulf of Guinea and a single mountain in Cameroon.
It contains the following species:
 Fernando Po speirops (Zosterops brunneus)
 Príncipe speirops (Zosterops leucophoeus)
 Black-capped speirops (Zosterops lugubris)
 Mount Cameroon speirops (Zosterops melanocephalus)

References 

Zosterops
Taxonomy articles created by Polbot

pl:Speirops